Matan may refer to:

 Matan, Israel, a settlement in central Israel
 Matan (given name), a Hebrew given name (including a list of people with the name)
 Matan I, 9th-century BC Phoenician king
 Alexandru Mățan, Romanian footballer

See also 
 El Matan, Israeli outpost in the West Bank
 Matan Women's Institute for Torah Studies
 Madhan (disambiguation)
 Maton